Nikhat Kazmi (1958/59 – 20 January 2012) was a senior correspondent and well-known film critic from, born Allahabad, Uttar Pradesh, who had been writing for The Times of India since 1987. She died of breast cancer in 2012, at age 53.

Books
 If Shakespeare was a gun: a play. Writers Workshop, 1984.
 Ire in the soul: bollywood's angry years. HarperCollins Publishers India, 1996. .
 The Dream Merchants of Bollywood. UBS Publishers' Distribuors, 1998. .
 Times Guide to Hollywood Blockbusters. Times Group Books. .
 Times Movie Guide. 2007, Times Group Books. .

References

External links
Official site

1950s births
2012 deaths
Indian film critics
Indian women journalists
Indian reporters and correspondents
Deaths from breast cancer
Place of death missing
Date of birth missing
Journalists from Uttar Pradesh